El Carmen del Darién is a municipality and town in the northern part of the Chocó Department, Colombia.

Climate
El Carmen del Darién has a tropical rainforest climate (Köppen Af) with heavy to very heavy rainfall year round. The following climate data is for Curbaradó, the capital of the municipality.

Municipalities of Chocó Department